The Men's 1500 metres T46 event at the 2012 Summer Paralympics took place at the London Olympic Stadium from 1 to 4 September.

Records
Prior to the competition, the existing World and Paralympic records were as follows:

Results

Round 1
Competed 1 September 2012 from 12:53. Qual. rule: first 3 in each heat (Q) plus the 2 fastest other times (q) qualified.

Heat 1

Heat 2

Final
Competed 4 September 2012 at 20:24.

 
Q = qualified by place. q = qualified by time. WR = World Record. PB = Personal Best. SB = Seasonal Best. DNF = Did not finish.

References

Athletics at the 2012 Summer Paralympics
2012 in men's athletics